Pirkko may refer to:

Pirkko Aro (1923–2012), Finnish journalist and politician
Pirkko Irmeli Ekström (1945–2011), Finnish chess player
Pirkko Eskola, Finnish physicist
Pirkko Hämäläinen (born 1959), Finnish actress
Pirkko Hämäläinen (diplomat) (born 1961), diplomat
Pirkko Korkee (born 1927), Finnish former cross-country skier
Pirkko-Liisa Kyöstilä, Finnish diplomat
Pirkko Länsivuori (1926–2012), Finnish sprinter
Pirkko-Liisa Lehtosalo-Hilander, Finnish archaeologist
Pirkko Lepistö, (1922–2005), Finnish painter with naivistic style
Pirkko Määttä (born 1959), Finnish former cross-country skier
Pirkko Mannola (born 1938), Finnish actress and singer
Pirkko Mattila, Finnish politician, former Member of the Finnish Parliament
Pirkko Nieminen (born 1939), Finnish gymnast
Pirkko Pyykönen (born 1936), Finnish gymnast
Pirkko Ruohonen-Lerner (born 1957), Finnish politician, Member of the European Parliament
Pirkko Saisio (born 1949), Finnish author, actress and director
Pirkko Turpeinen (born 1940), Finnish psychiatrist and politician
Pirkko Työläjärvi (born 1938), Finnish politician
Pirkko Vahtero (born 1936), Finnish graphic designer and heraldist
Pirkko Vilppunen (1934–2007), Finnish gymnast

Finnish feminine given names